Swing Kids is a 2018 South Korean musical drama film directed by Kang Hyeong-cheol and based on the Korean musical Roh Ki-soo. The film stars Doh Kyung-soo, Park Hye-su, Jared Grimes, Oh Jung-se and Kim Min-ho. The film was released on December 19, 2018.

Swing Kids was screened at The 2019 1st PyeongChang International Peace Film Festival on August 18, 2019.

Plot summary 
The story takes place in Geoje prison camp during the Korean War in 1951. Ro Ki-soo (Do Kyung-soo), a rebellious North Korean soldier, falls in love with tap dancing after meeting Jackson (Jared Grimes), an American officer and former Broadway star who has been tasked with putting together a dance company. Kang Byung-sam (Oh Jung-se) auditions for the company in hopes of finding his wife, alongside Xiao Pang (Kim Min-ho), a Chinese soldier and born dancer who cannot dance for more than a minute due to angina, and Yang Pan-rae (Park Hye-su), who needs money but says there's no money through dancing.

Cast

Main
 Doh Kyung-soo as Roh Ki-soo
 Park Hye-su as Yang Pan-rae
 Jared Grimes as Jackson
 Oh Jung-se as Kang Byung-sam
  as Xiao Pang

Others

 Ross Kettle as Brigadier General Roberts
 A.J. Simmons as Jamie
 Song Jae-ryong as Sam Sik
 Lee Gyoo-seong as Man-cheol
 Lee David as Kwang-gook 
 Joo Hae-eun as Mae-hwa	
 Lee Yool-rim as Hwang Ki-dong
 Kim Dong-geon as Ro Gi-jin
 Park Jin-joo as Linda
 Joo Hae-eun as Mae-hwa (Japanese apricot flower)
 Park Hyung-soo as Interpreter
 Lee Dong-yong as Black marketeer 
 Choi Eun-kyung as Nancy
 Lee Rang-seo as Stacy
 Lim Seo-yeong as Candy
 Kim Eun-joo as Wendy
 Park Ji-eun as Barbara
 Oh Kyeong-hwa as Julia

Cameo
Kim Min-jae as Ro Gi-jin's voice dub

Production 
Director Kang Hyeong-cheol is known for his hit films Scandal Makers, Sunny, and Swing Kids marks the director's return after three year from directing his hit film Tazza: The Hidden Card. Filming of Swing Kids started on October 18, 2017 and ended on February 20, 2018 in Anseong, Gyeonggi Province, South Korea.

Release 
Swing Kids was released in 23 countries including America, Canada, Australia, Singapore, Malaysia, Japan, Indonesia. The film was released in Hong Kong and Macao in January 2019.

The VIP premiere of Swing Kids was held On December 6.

Promotion 
On November 12, 2018, the director and main cast of Swing Kids held a press conference where they discussed the film and answered reporters' questions. On the same day, a showcase for the film was held, where Do Kyung-soo, Park Hye-su and Oh Jung-se performed a segment of Tap dancing along with other tap dancing professionals, and later talked about the film along with director Kang Hyeong-cheol. On November 26, the director and the cast attended a movie talk on V Live.

On December 4, the cast and director attended a media distribution preview event for the film. On December 17, The cast and directory attended an event called "Chewing Chat" at Lotte Cinema World Tower, and also held a stage greeting in the same place. On December 18, Do Kyung-soo, Park Hye-su and Oh Jung-se went on the radio show Cultwo Show were the talked about the movie, and later held another stage greeting at CGV Yongsan I-Park Mall.

Reception

Critical response 

The film received mixed reviews from critics. Praise was given to the film's production design and music, with criticisms directing towards the long running time and the structure of the film. Guy Lodge from Variety, wrote about the film: "Too often, it simply feels like two films wrestling in one roomy framework, sometimes overlapping to awkward effect".

Park Boram from Yonhap News Agency , wrote: "The film's booming tapping sounds set against the film's throwback soundtrack -- which includes David Bowie's "Modern Love," Benny Goodman's "Sing Sing Sing," The Beatles' "Free as a Bird," as well as Korean veteran singer Jung Su-ra's popular 1988 song "Joy"—drive colorful vibrancy into the film, making the audience twitch with amusement throughout the film's 133-minute running time.", Park also added that the "musicality and a Christmas scene close to the end make the production a perfect film choice for the holiday season."

The film was ranked No.3 by Pierce Conran from Modern Korean Cinema in Top 15 Korean Films of 2018. Conran wrote: "Swing Kids was without a doubt the best theatrical experience I had all year. Infectiously rhythmic, this Korean War POW camp tap dance extravaganza will have you yearning for old-school Hollywood showmanship and begging for more when the curtain falls."

Box office 
Prior to its release, Swing Kids ranked first in the pre-sales, with 70,256 viewers and 21.6% reservation rate. The film ranked second place on Korean theaters among Korean movies, since its release. On December 25, Swing Kids began its seat sales and ranked first in the box office, surpassing Aquaman and The Drug King by 32% and 56% respectively. On December 27, Swing Kids attracted more than 1 million viewers.

In the United States it made $222,001, South Korea $10,672,098, Australia $17,141, and in New Zealand $2,157.

Soundtrack

Awards and nominations

References

External links

2018 films
2010s Korean-language films
2010s musical drama films
South Korean musical drama films
South Korean war drama films
Next Entertainment World films
Films directed by Kang Hyeong-cheol
2018 war drama films
2018 drama films
2010s South Korean films